Daria Gavrilova and Storm Sanders were the defending champions, but Gavrilova chose to participate at İstanbul and Sanders chose to participate at Granby instead.

Ashley Weinhold and Caitlin Whoriskey won the title, defeating Nao Hibino and Rosie Johanson in the final, 6–4, 3–6, [14–12].

Seeds

Draw

References 
 Draw

FSP Gold River Women's Challenger - Doubles
2015